The 1975 NHL Amateur Draft was the 13th NHL Entry Draft. It was held at the NHL office in Montreal, Quebec. The two-time defending Stanley Cup champion Philadelphia Flyers made the most noise at the draft, trading Bill Clement, Don McLean, and the 18th overall pick to the Washington Capitals for the number one overall selection, which they used to select Mel Bridgman. Later in round nine the Flyers became the first NHL team to select a Soviet-born and trained player in the amateur draft, selecting Latvian Viktor Khatulev 160th overall.

The last active player in the NHL from this draft class was Dave Taylor, who retired after the 1993–94 season.

Selections by round
Below are listed the selections in the 1975 NHL amateur draft.

Round one

 The Washington Capitals' first-round pick went to the Philadelphia Flyers as the result of a trade on June 3, 1975 that sent Bill Clement, Don McLean and Philadelphia's first-round pick in 1975 to Washington in exchange for this pick.
 The St. Louis Blues' first-round pick went to the Montreal Canadiens as the result of a trade on May 15, 1973 that sent Montreal's first-round pick and third-round pick in 1973 to St. Louis in exchange for St. Louis' first-round pick and fourth-round pick in 1973 and this pick.
 The Los Angeles Kings' first-round pick went to the Montreal Canadiens as the result of a trade on November 4, 1971 that sent Denis DeJordy, Dale Hoganson, Noel Price and Doug Robinson to Montreal in exchange for Rogatien Vachon and Montreal's option to swap 1975 1st round picks with Los Angeles.
 The Montreal Canadiens' first-round pick went to the Los Angeles Kings as the result of a trade on November 4, 1971 that sent Denis DeJordy, Dale Hoganson, Noel Price and Doug Robinson to Montreal in exchange for Rogatien Vachon and Montreal's option to swap 1975 1st round picks with Los Angeles.
 The Philadelphia Flyers' first-round pick went to the Washington Capitals as the result of a trade on June 3, 1975 that sent Washington's first-round pick in 1975 NHL Amateur Draft in exchange for Bill Clement, Don McLean and this pick.

Round two

 The Minnesota North Stars' second-round pick went to the Montreal Canadiens as the result of a trade on May 15, 1973 that sent Montreal's second-round pick in 1973 NHL Amateur Draft to Minnesota in exchange for this pick.
 The Philadelphia Flyers' second-round pick went to the St. Louis Blues as the result of a trade on September 16, 1974 that sent Wayne Stephenson to Philadelphia in exchange for the rights to Randy Andreachuk and this pick.

Round three

 The Washington Capitals' third-round pick went to the Detroit Red Wings as the result of a trade on February 28, 1975 that sent Nelson Pyatt to Washington's in exchange for this pick.
 The Detroit Red Wings' third-round pick went to the Minnesota North Stars as the result of a trade on October 1, 1974 that sent Gary Bergman to Detroit in exchange for this pick.
 The Atlanta Flames' third-round pick went to the Buffalo Sabres as the result of a trade on May 21, 1974 that sent the rights to Jim McMasters to Atlanta in exchange for this pick.
 The St. Louis Blues' third-round pick went to the Detroit Red Wings as the result of a trade on December 30, 1974 that sent Red Berenson St. Louis in exchange for Phil Roberto and this pick.
 The Boston Bruins' third-round pick went to the Detroit Red Wings as the result of a trade on February 18, 1975 that sent Earl Anderson and Hank Nowak to Boston in exchange for Walt McKechnie and this pick.
 The Los Angeles Kings' third-round pick went to the Montreal Canadiens as the result of a trade on August 22, 1972 that sent Terry Harper to Los Angeles in exchange for Los Angeles' second-round pick in 1974 NHL Amateur Draft, first-round pick in 1976 NHL Amateur Draft and this pick.

Round four

 The Toronto Maple Leafs' fourth-round pick went to the Boston Bruins as the result of a trade on June 3, 1975 that sent Boston's third-round pick in 1976 NHL Amateur Draft to Toronto in exchange for this pick.

Round five

Round six

Round seven

Round eight

Round nine

Round ten

 The Chicago Black Hawks' tenth-round pick went to the Toronto Maple Leafs as the result of a trade on June 3, 1975 that sent cash to Chicago in exchange for this pick.

Round eleven

 The Washington Capitals' eleventh-round pick went to the Detroit Red Wings as the result of a trade on June 3, 1975 that sent cash to Washington in exchange for this pick.
 The Chicago Black Hawks' eleventh-round pick went to the Toronto Maple Leafs as the result of a trade on June 3, 1975 that sent cash to Chicago in exchange for this pick.

Round twelve

 The Washington Capitals' twelfth-round pick went to the Toronto Maple Leafs as the result of a trade on June 3, 1975 that sent cash to Washington in exchange for this pick.
 The Kansas City Scouts' twelfth-round pick went to the Toronto Maple Leafs as the result of a trade on June 3, 1975 that sent cash to Kansas City in exchange for this pick.
 The St. Louis Blues' twelfth-round pick went to the Toronto Maple Leafs as the result of a trade on June 3, 1975 that sent cash to St. Louis in exchange for this pick.

Round thirteen

 The St. Louis Blues' thirteenth-round pick went to the New York Rangers as the result of a trade on June 3, 1975 that sent cash to St. Louis in exchange for this pick.

Round fourteen

Round fifteen

Round sixteen

Round seventeen

Round eighteen

Draftees based on nationality

See also
 1975–76 NHL season
 1975 WHA Amateur Draft
 List of NHL players

Notes

References
 2005 NHL Official Guide & Record Book

External links
 HockeyDraftCentral.com
 1975 NHL Amateur Draft player stats at The Internet Hockey Database

Draft
National Hockey League Entry Draft